Asokwa Municipal District is one of the forty-three districts in Ashanti Region, Ghana. Originally it was a sub-metropolitan district council within the Kumasi Metropolitan Assembly until 15 March 2018, when it was elevated to municipal district assembly status to become Asokwa Municipal District. The municipality is located in the central part of Ashanti Region and has Asokwa as its capital town.

References 

Districts of Ashanti Region